Atlantasellus is a genus of crustaceans, and the only member of the family Atlantasellidae. It contains these species:

Atlantasellus cavernicolus is endemic to Bermuda and is included on the IUCN Red List as Critically Endangered.
Atlantasellus dominicanus was described in 2001, having been collected in coastal karsts in the Dominican Republic.

References

Isopod genera
Monotypic crustacean genera
Taxonomy articles created by Polbot